The Cape Melville bar-lipped skink (Glaphyromorphus othelarrni)  is a species of skink in the genus Glaphyromorphusfound, found in Queensland in Australia.

References

Glaphyromorphus
Reptiles described in 2014
Taxa named by Conrad J. Hoskin
Taxa named by Patrick J. Couper